Enid Markey (February 22, 1894 – November 15, 1981) was an American theatre, film, radio, and television actress, whose career spanned over 50 years, extending from the early 1900s to the late 1960s. In movies, she was the first performer to portray the fictional character Jane, Tarzan's "jungle" companion and later his wife. Markey performed as Jane twice in 1918, costarring with Elmo Lincoln in the films Tarzan of The Apes and The Romance of Tarzan.

Early years
Markey was born in Dillon, Colorado. Her education came in boarding school in Denver.

Career 
Markey acted on stage and in vaudeville before turning to movies. Her first film role was in The Fortunes of War (1911). During the production of The Wrath of the Gods (1914), Markey, a "leading lady with the New York Motion Picture Company", was "badly injured" during the production. During her scene in which the lava flow destroys the village, she was surrounded by smoke and fumes, and was nearly asphyxiated, but had recovered by May 1914.

After Markey made the first two Tarzan films, she turned to acting on stage, saying "I really wanted to learn how to act." She acted in 29 Broadway plays, beginning with Up in Mabel's Room (1919) and ending with What Did We Do Wrong? (1967).

During the 1950s and 1960s, she appeared in several television series including Alfred Hitchcock Presents, The Adventures of Ozzie and Harriet and The Defenders.

In 1963, she guest-starred as Mrs. Mendelbright, Barney Fife's landlady on The Andy Griffith Show in the episode "Up in Barney's Room." Later, in 1966, she appeared as Grandma Pyle on Gomer Pyle, U.S.M.C. in the episode "Grandma Pyle: Fortune Teller." She also had two appearances in The Adventures of Ozzie and Harriet.

In the 1960-1961 season, Markey had a regular role as Aunt Violet Flower in the sitcom Bringing Up Buddy, co-starring Frank Aletter and Doro Merande. Markey and Merande played spinster aunts who provide a home for their bachelor nephew, stockbroker Buddy Flower, played by Aletter. 

Her last appearance was in The Boston Strangler (1968).

Personal life 
Markey married American Can Company executive George W. Cobb in 1942. He died in 1948.

Death 
While visiting friends in Long Island, New York on November 13 1981, Markey suffered a heart attack and was admitted to South Side Hospital in Bay Shore, New York, where she died two days later at age 87.

Partial filmography 

 The Battle of Gettysburg (1913)
 Shorty's Sacrifice (1914, short) - Ethel Somners
 The Wrath of the Gods (1914)
 The Cup of Life (1915) - Ruth Fiske
 The Darkening Trail (1915) - Ruby McGraw
 The Mating (1915) - Daisy Arnold
 The Iron Strain (1915) - Octavia Van Ness
 Between Men (1915) - Lina Hampdon
 Aloha Oe (1915) - Kalaniweo
 The Despoiler (1915) - Sylvia Damien
 Civilization (1915) - Katheryn Haldemann
 The Conqueror (1916) - Viva Madison
 The No-Good Guy (1916) - Lucia Andrada
 The Phantom (1916) - Avice Bereton
 The Captive God (1916) - Lolomi
 Shell 43 (1916) - Adrienne von Altman
 Lieutenant Danny, U.S.A. (1916) - Ysobel Ventura
 Jim Grimsby's Boy (1916) - Bill Grimsby
 The Devil's Double (1916) - Naomi Tarleton
 Blood Will Tell (1917) - Nora North
 The Yankee Way (1917) - Princess Alexia
 The Curse of Eve (1917) - Eva Stanley
 The Zeppelin's Last Raid (1917) - The girl
 Cheating the Public (1918) - Mary Garvin
 Tarzan of the Apes (1918) - Jane Porter
 Six Shooter Andy (1918) - Susan Allenby
 The Romance of Tarzan (1918) - Jane
 Mother, I Need You (1918)
 Sink or Swim (1920) - Princess Alexia
 Snafu (1945) - Aunt Emily
 The Naked City (1948) - Mrs. Hylton
 Take One False Step (1949) - Clara
 The Boston Strangler (1968) - Edna

References

External links 

 
 
 Enid Markey papers, 1895-1971, held by the Billy Rose Theatre Division, New York Public Library for the Performing Arts

1894 births
1981 deaths
Actresses from Colorado
American film actresses
American silent film actresses
American stage actresses
American television actresses
People from Summit County, Colorado
20th-century American actresses
Actresses from Los Angeles
People from Bay Shore, New York